A list of films produced by the Bollywood film industry based in Mumbai in 1923:

1923 in Indian cinema
Seventy per cent of the silent films produced in Indian cinema till 1923 were either mythological or devotional. The Gods were represented in the mythological films, while God-men featured in the devotional. The rest thirty percent films were associated with the historical and social drama genres.
Modhu Bose, Hindi and Bengali film director and scenarist, started his career as an actor with Madan Theatres Ltd.
J. F. Madan, who started Madan Theatres Ltd. in 1919, died in 1923. His third son, J. J. Madan, took over the management of Madan Theatres.

Films
Noorjehan directed by J. J. Madan and produced by Madan Theatres Ltd. was one of the notable films of 1923. It starred Patience Cooper with  Albertina, Manchersha Chapgar and Ezra Mir.
Patni Pratap, a Madan Theatres Ltd. production and directed by J. J. Madan, had actress Patience Cooper playing the first "double role" in Indian cinema.
Savitri also called Savitri Satyavan is cited as India's "first international co-production". Directed by Giorgio Mannini and produced by Cines (Rome) and Madan Theatres, it was based on the mythological tale of Savitri Satyavan. Rina De Liguoro played the role of Savitri, while Angelo Ferrari acted as Satyavan. The film was "promoted" as Italy's most "daring" film.
Sinhagad was directed by Baburao Painter for the Maharashtra Film Company. It was based on Hari Narayan Apte's Marathi historical novel Gad Aala Pan Simha Gela and starred Balasaab Yadav, Kamladevi, Zhunzharrao Pawar and V. Shantaram. Called "India's first full-scale historical" the story involved the Maratha Emperor Shivaji and his lieutenant Tanaji Malasure.

A-J

K-R

S-Z

References

External links
Bollywood films of 1923 at IMDb

1923
Bollywood
Films, Bollywood